Hale Soygazi (born 21 September 1950) is a Turkish actress and beauty pageant titleholder.

Biography 

She was born on 21 September in Istanbul, Turkey in 1950. She studied French philology at the university. She was chosen as 'Miss Turkey' in 1973 and also did modeling for magazines. She made her film debut in a leading role in Kara Murat opposite famous actor Cüneyt Arkın. In 1978, she won her first Golden Orange award for her leading role in Maden.

She was married to folk singer Ahmet Özhan who acted with her in Çocuğumu İstiyorum, but they divorced later. Then she married Murat Belge.

Filmography 

 2022– - Hayatımın Şansı
 2015 - Kaderimin Yazıldığı Gün
 2011–2013 - Kuzey Güney
 2009 - Bu Kalp Seni Unutur Mu?
 2004 - Sil Baştan
 1997 - Bir Umut
 1996 - Usta Beni Öldürsene
 1995 - Aşk Üzerine Söylenmemiş Herşey
 1992 - Cazibe Hanımın Gündüz Düşleri
 1990 - Bekle Dedim Gölgeye
 1989 - Küçük Balıklar Üzerine Bir Masal
 1989 - Cahide
 1987 - Kadının Adı Yok Işık
 1985 - Bir Avuç Cennet
 1984 - Bir Yudum Sevgi
 1978 - Maden
 1977 - Kördüğüm
 1977 - Sevgili Dayım
 1976 - Süt Kardeşler
 1975 - Nereden Çıktı Bu Velet
 1975 - Adamını Bul
 1975 - Gece Kuşu Zehra
 1975 - Bak Yeşil Yeşil
 1975 - Küçük Bey
 1974 - Mirasyediler
 1974 - Kanlı Deniz
 1974 - Unutma Beni
 1974 - Ceza Alev
 1974 - Unutama Beni
 1974 - Gariban
 1973 - Aşk Mahkumu
 1973 - Kabadayının Sonu
 1973 - Ölüme Koşanlar
 1973 - Şüphe
 1973 - Tatlım
 1973 - Aşkımla Oynama
 1973 - Bataklık Bülbülü
 1973 - Arap Abdo
 1973 - Vurun Kahpeye
 1973 - Oh Olsun
 1973 - Sevilmek İstiyorum
 1973 - Bir Demet Menekşe
 1973 - Çocuğumu İstiyorum
 1973 - Mahkum
 1972 - Bir Garip Yolcu
 1972 - Kara Murat: Fatih'ın Fedaisi
 1972 - Kahbe / Bir Kız Böyle Düştü
 1972 - İtham Ediyorum

References 

 Biyografi.net - Biography of Hale Soygazi (Turkish)

External links 

 

1950 births
Living people
Actresses from Istanbul
Turkish film actresses
Turkish female models
Erenköy Girls High School alumni
Best Actress Golden Orange Award winners
Miss Turkey winners
Golden Orange Life Achievement Award winners
20th-century Turkish actresses